North Hopewell Township is a township in York County, Pennsylvania, United States. The population was 2,723 at the 2020 census.

Geography
According to the United States Census Bureau, the township has a total area of 18.6 square miles (48.1 km2), all of it land. The township surrounds the borough of Winterstown.

Demographics
As of the census of 2000, there were 2,507 people, 942 households, and 736 families living in the township.  The population density was 135.0 people per square mile (52.1/km2).  There were 984 housing units at an average density of 53.0/sq mi (20.4/km2).  The racial makeup of the township was 98.32% White, 0.36% African American, 0.12% Native American, 0.24% Asian, and 0.96% from two or more races. Hispanic or Latino of any race were 0.56% of the population.

There were 942 households, out of which 34.4% had children under the age of 18 living with them, 69.2% were married couples living together, 5.6% had a female householder with no husband present, and 21.8% were non-families. 17.2% of all households were made up of individuals, and 6.3% had someone living alone who was 65 years of age or older.  The average household size was 2.66 and the average family size was 3.01.

In the township the population was spread out, with 24.6% under the age of 18, 5.0% from 18 to 24, 31.1% from 25 to 44, 28.1% from 45 to 64, and 11.2% who were 65 years of age or older.  The median age was 40 years. For every 100 females, there were 101.7 males.  For every 100 females age 18 and over, there were 97.8 males.

The median income for a household in the township was $47,139, and the median income for a family was $55,438. Males had a median income of $37,588 versus $26,646 for females. The per capita income for the township was $20,993.  About 2.3% of families and 2.5% of the population were below the poverty line, including 2.5% of those under age 18 and none of those age 65 or over.

References

Populated places established in 1734
Townships in York County, Pennsylvania
Townships in Pennsylvania